Geymond Vital (24 January 1897 – 6 December 1987) was a French film, stage and television actor.

Filmography

References

Bibliography
 Goble, Alan. The Complete Index to Literary Sources in Film. Walter de Gruyter, 1999.

External links

1897 births
1987 deaths
French male film actors
French male silent film actors
20th-century French male actors
People from Isère